The men's single sculls was a rowing event held as part of the Rowing at the 1912 Summer Olympics programme. It was the fourth appearance of the event. The competition was held from 17 to 19 July at Djurgårdsbrunnsviken. There were 13 competitors from 11 nations. Each nation could have up to two boats. The event was won by Wally Kinnear of Great Britain, the nation's second consecutive victory in the men's single sculls. The other three medal-winning nations were new to the podium in the event. Kinnear beat Everard Butler of Canada in the semifinals, while Belgium's Polydore Veirman prevailed over Mart Kuusik of the Russian Empire; Butler and Kuusik received bronze medals. Veirman earned silver after falling to Kinnear in the final.

Background

This was the fourth appearance of the event. Rowing had been on the programme in 1896 but was cancelled due to bad weather. The single sculls has been held every time that rowing has been contested, beginning in 1900.

The two favorites in the event were likely Wally Kinnear of Great Britain (the Diamond Challenge Sculls winner in 1910 and 1911) and Polydore Veirman of Belgium, who would win the European championship later in 1912. Another strong contender was Everard Butler of Canada, the top North American sculler and winner of the National Association of Amateur Oarsmen events in 1911 and 1912.

Australasia, Austria, Bohemia, Denmark, Finland, and the Russian Empire each made their debut in the event. Great Britain made its third appearance, most among nations, having missed only the 1904 Games in St. Louis.

Competition format

As in 1908, the 1912 tournament featured four rounds of one-on-one races. Semifinal losers each received bronze medals. For the first time, the Olympic course used the now-standard distance of 2000 metres.

Schedule

Results

First round

Heat 1

Kuusic nearly collided with Heinrich in the first heat, leading to a protest that resulted in the heat being re-rowed the next day; Heinrich was disqualified in the second running of the heat. Three of the heats were walkovers.

Heat 2

Heat 3

Heat 4

Heat 5

Ivan Schweizer of Bohemia is listed as starting in this heat in the Official Report; however, it appears he did not actually compete.

Heat 6

Heat 7

Heat8

Quarterfinals

Mészáros crossed in front of Veirman in the first quarterfinal, resulting in a protest and the contest being held over. The second time, Veirman got an early lead and kept it throughout. Simonsen abandoned the competition, giving Butler a walkover in the second quarterfinal. Kuusic won the final quarterfinal by three lengths, despite having been the only quarterfinalist to have already rowed during the day, in his rematch against Heinrich.

Quarterfinal 1

Quarterfinal 2

Quarterfinal 3

Quarterfinal 4

Semifinals

Semifinal 1

Semifinal 2

Final

Results summary

References

Sources
 
 

Rowing at the 1912 Summer Olympics